The 41st Legislative Assembly of Ontario was a legislature of the government of the province of Ontario, Canada. The membership was set by the 2014 Ontario general election. The 41st parliament of Ontario was dissolved on May 8, 2018.

It was controlled by a Liberal Party majority, with Liberal leader Kathleen Wynne serving as Premier of Ontario.

The Official Opposition was the Progressive Conservative Party led by Vic Fedeli, and the third party was the New Democratic Party, led by Andrea Horwath. At dissolution the Trillium Party had one MPP, Jack MacLaren, but lacked official party status so MacLaren was officially considered an independent by the legislature.

Timeline of the 41st Parliament of Ontario
The following notable events occurred during the 2014-2018 period:

 July 2, 2014 : The 41st Parliament of Ontario begin its first session. Jim Wilson becomes Leader of the Opposition after being chosen interim leader of the Progressive Conservatives. Dave Levac, member from Brant was re-elected as the speaker of the Legislative Assembly of Ontario.
 July 3, 2014 : Lieutenant Governor David Onley addresses the speech from the throne for the last time as Lieutenant Governor of Ontario, beginning the first session.
 September 23, 2014 : Elizabeth Dowdeswell sworn in as Lieutenant Governor of Ontario, making the top three of the Order of precedence in Ontario all female for the very first time in the history.
 November 21, 2014 : Joe Cimino, the MPP representing Sudbury resigned his seat.
 February 5, 2015 : The former MP Glenn Thibeault was elected as a Liberal MPP in Sudbury, replacing Joe Cimino.
 August 1, 2015 : PC MPP Garfield Dunlop (Simcoe North) resigns in order to allow PC leader Patrick Brown to run for a seat in the legislature.
 August 28, 2015 : PC MPP Christine Elliott (Whitby-Oshawa) resigns her seat.
 September 3, 2015: In a by-election, PC leader Patrick Brown is elected the MPP for Simcoe North
 February 11, 2016: Lorne Coe elected PC MPP for Whitby-Oshawa in a by-election.
 March 23, 2016: Liberal MPP Bas Balkissoon (Scarborough—Rouge River) resigns his seat.
 June 30, 2016: Liberal MPP Madeleine Meilleur (Ottawa—Vanier) resigns her seat.
 September 1, 2016: Raymond Cho wins the Scarborough—Rouge River by-election for the PC's, taking away the seat from the Liberals.
 September 8, 2016: Lieutenant Governor Elizabeth Dowdeswell accepts the advice of Premier Kathleen Wynne to briefly prorogue the Legislature, ending the first session.
 September 12, 2016: Beginning of the second session with the Speech from the Throne.
 September 16, 2016: PC MPP Tim Hudak (Niagara West—Glanbrook) resigns his seat.
 November 17, 2016:  By-elections are held in Ottawa—Vanier (won by Liberal Nathalie Des Rosiers) and Niagara West—Glanbrook (won by PC Sam Oosterhoff).  Oosterhoff was 19 years old at the time and became the youngest Ontario MPP in history.
January 1, 2017: David Orazietti (Liberal, Sault Ste. Marie) resigns his seat to take a senior position at Sault College.
May 28, 2017: Carleton—Mississippi Mills MPP Jack MacLaren is removed from the PC party caucus by Patrick Brown after a 2012 video including controversial remarks about Franco-Ontarians becomes public. By the afternoon of May 28, MacLaren announced on Twitter that he had joined the minor right-wing Trillium Party of Ontario.
June 1, 2017: Progressive Conservative Ross Romano wins the Sault Ste. Marie by-election taking the seat formerly held by Liberal David Orazietti.
July 31, 2017: Glen Murray (Liberal, Toronto Centre) announces resignation effective September 1, 2017 to join the Pembina Institute as executive director.
October 20, 2017: Jagmeet Singh (NDP, Bramalea—Gore—Malton) resigns his seat after being elected leader of the federal NDP.
December 31, 2017: Cheri DiNovo (NDP, Parkdale—High Park) resigns her seat.
January 25, 2018: Patrick Brown resigns as PC leader after being accused of sexual misconduct by two women.
January 26, 2018: Nipissing MPP Vic Fedeli is elected interim PC by caucus members.
February 16, 2018: Former PC leader Patrick Brown (Simcoe North) is ejected from the PC caucus.
February 26, 2018: Eric Hoskins (St. Paul's) resigns as Minister of Health and his seat in the legislature to accept a federal appointment.
March 15, 2018: Lieutenant Governor Elizabeth Dowdeswell accepts the advice of Premier Kathleen Wynne to briefly prorogue the Legislature, ending the second session.
March 19, 2018: Beginning of the third session with the Speech from the Throne.
 April 9: PC Kitchener-Conestoga MPP Michael Harris is removed from his party's caucus over text messages "of a sexual nature" to a former intern. He was removed 3 days after the party barred him from running  as a  PC candidate and 2 days following his own announcement saying he would not seek re-election due to health issues.
 May 8, 2018: The 41st parliament of Ontario was dissolved by lieutenant Governor Elizabeth Dowdeswell, a provincial election will be held on June 7, 2018

Summary of seat changes

Party standings at dissolution

Roster

Officeholders
Officeholders in the Legislature at dissolution on May 8, 2018.

Speaker
 Speaker of the Legislative Assembly of Ontario: Hon. Dave Levac (Liberal)

Other Chair occupants
Deputy Speaker and Chair of the Committee of the Whole: Soo Wong (Liberal)

Leaders
 Premier of Ontario: Hon. Kathleen Wynne (Liberal)
 Leader of the Opposition: Vic Fedeli (Progressive Conservative)
 Leader of the Ontario New Democratic Party: Andrea Horwath

Floor leaders
 Government House Leader: Hon. Yasir Naqvi
 Opposition House Leader: Jim Wilson
 NDP House Leader: Gilles Bisson

Whips
 Chief Government Whip: Jim Bradley
 Official Opposition Whip: John Yakabuski
 NDP Whip: John Vanthof

Front benches
 Executive Council of Ontario
 Official Opposition Shadow Cabinet of the 41st Legislative Assembly of Ontario
 Ontario New Democratic Party Shadow Cabinet of the 41st Legislative Assembly of Ontario

Membership changes

By-election results

References

External links
 Legislative Assembly of Ontario. 

41st Legislative Assembly of Ontario
Parliament, 41
Parliament, 41
Parliament, 41
Parliament, 41
Parliament, 41
Parliament, 41
Parliament, 41
2014 in Canadian politics
2015 in Canadian politics
2016 in Canadian politics
2017 in Canadian politics
2018 in Canadian politics